A docket in the United States is the official summary of proceedings in a court of law.  In the United Kingdom in modern times it is an official document relating to delivery of something, with similar meanings to these two elsewhere. In the late nineteenth century the term referred to a large folio book in which clerks recorded all filings and court proceedings for each case, although use has been documented  since 1485.

Historical usage
The term originated in England; it was recorded in the form "doggette" in 1485, and later also as doket, dogget(t), docquett, docquet, and docket. The derivation and original sense are obscure, although it has been suggested that it derives from the verb "to dock", in the sense of cutting short (e.g. the tail of a dog or horse); a long document summarised has been docked, or docket using old spelling. It was long used in England for legal purposes (there was an official called the Clerk of the Dockets in the early nineteenth century), although discontinued in modern English legal usage.

Docket was described in The American and English Encyclopedia of Law as a courts summary, digest, or register.  A usage note in this 1893 text warns that term docket and calendar are not synonymous.

A 1910 law dictionary states the terms trial docket and calendar are synonymous.

United States
In the United States, court dockets are considered to be public records, and many public records databases and directories include references to court dockets. Rules of civil procedure often state that the court clerk shall record certain information "on the docket" when a specific event occurs. The Federal Courts use the PACER (Public Access Court Electronic Records) system to house dockets and documents on all federal civil, criminal and bankruptcy cases, available to the public for a fee.

The term is also sometimes used informally to refer to a court calendar, the schedule of the appearances, arguments and hearings scheduled for a court. It may also be used as a metonym to refer to a court's caseload as a whole. Thus, either sense may be intended (depending upon the context) in the frequent use of the phrase "crowded dockets" by legal journalists and commentators.

Supreme Court
In its meaning as calendar, the docket of the United States Supreme Court is different both in its composition and significance. The justices of the Supreme Court have almost complete discretion over the cases they choose to hear. From the large number of cases which it receives, only 70 to 100 will be placed on the docket. The Solicitor General decides which cases to present on behalf of the federal government.

Court docket links

Official
Supreme Court
United States Supreme Court Calendar

Court of Appeals
Public Access to Court Electronic Records (PACER) is a system for public access to court records, subject to payment.
Federal Circuit
First Circuit Court of Appeals, Court Calendar
Second Circuit Court of Appeals, Court Calendar
Third Circuit Court of Appeals PACER
Fourth Circuit Court of Appeals PACER
Fifth Circuit Court of Appeals, Appeals Calendar
Sixth Circuit Court of Appeals, Oral Argument Calendar
Seventh Circuit Court of Appeals Oral Arguments
Seventh Circuit Court of Appeals Court Calendar
Eighth Circuit Court of Appeals, Court Calendar
Ninth Circuit Court of Appeals Court Calendar, and dockets via PACER
Tenth Circuit Court of Appeals; Argument Calendar
Eleventh Circuit Court of Appeals "Voluntary filing to begin on 1 January 2012"

Federal District Courts
Iowa
Northern District of Iowa Has Decisions/Verdicts page. Links to PACER
Northern District of Iowa Bankruptcy
Southern District of Iowa
Southern District of Iowa Bankruptcy, Calendars

Unofficial
 Docket Alarm, Inc. provides a search engine and alerts for Federal Court dockets and bankruptcies, as well as providing programmatic access via an API.
 Inforuptcy.com is a PACER alternative website that provides all queries including dockets for U.S. bankruptcy courts.
 LegalDockets.com is the oldest docket portal on the internet. In addition to linking to all PACER courts, it also links to all state court dockets.

See also
 Calendar
 Minutes
 Schedule
 Transcript (law)

References

Calendars
Legal procedure
Common law legal terminology